Bury My Heart at Wounded Knee is a 2007 American Western historical drama television film adapted from the 1970 book of the same name by Dee Brown. The film was written by Daniel Giat, directed by Yves Simoneau and produced by HBO Films. The book on which the film is based is a history of Native Americans in the American West in the 1860s and 1870s, focusing upon the transition from traditional ways of living to living on reservations and their treatment during that period. The title of the film and the book is taken from a line in the Stephen Vincent Benét poem "American Names." It was shot in Calgary, Alberta, Canada, and premiered on HBO on May 27, 2007.

Plot
The plot, which is based on events covered by several chapters of Brown's book, other sources, and on real events, revolves around four main characters: Charles Eastman né Ohiyesa, a young, mixed-race Sioux doctor educated at Dartmouth and Boston University, who is held up as proof of the success of assimilation; Sitting Bull, the Sioux chief who refuses to submit to U.S. government policies designed to strip his people of their identity, their dignity and their sacred land, the gold-laden Black Hills of the Dakotas; U.S. Senator Henry L. Dawes, an architect of government policy for allotment of Indian lands to individual households to force adoption of subsistence farming; and Red Cloud, whose decision to make peace with the American government and go to a reservation disturbed Sitting Bull.

While Eastman and his future wife Elaine Goodale, a reformer from New England and Superintendent of Indian Schools in the Dakotas, work to improve life for Native Americans on the reservation, Senator Dawes lobbies President Ulysses S. Grant for more humane treatment of the Native Americans.  He opposes the adversarial stance of General William Tecumseh Sherman. The Dawes Commission (held from 1893 to 1914) develops a proposal to break up the Great Sioux Reservation to allow for American demands for land while preserving enough land for the Sioux to live on. The Commission's plan is held up by Sitting Bull's opposition.  He has risen to leadership among the Sioux as one of the last chiefs to fight for their independence. Dawes, in turn, urges Eastman to help him convince the recalcitrant tribal leaders. After witnessing conditions on the Sioux reservation, Eastman refuses.

The prophet Wovoka raised Western Native American hopes with his spiritual movement based on a revival of religious practice and the ritual Ghost Dance; it was a messianic movement that promised an end of their suffering under the white man. The assassination of Sitting Bull, and the massacre, by the 7th Cavalry, of nearly 200 Native American men, women and children at Wounded Knee Creek on December 29, 1890, ended such hopes.

Henry L. Dawes' wanted to increase the cultural assimilation of Native Americans into American society by his Dawes Act (1887) and his later efforts as head of the Dawes Commission. During the 47 years of implementing the Act, Native Americans lost about 90 million acres (360,000 km²) of treaty land, or about two-thirds of their 1887 land base. About 90,000 Native Americans were made landless. The implementation of the Dawes Act disrupted Native American tribes' traditional communal life, culture, and unity.

Cast
 Adam Beach as Charles Eastman
 Anna Paquin as Elaine Goodale 
 Chevez Ezaneh as Ohiyesa / Young Charles
 August Schellenberg as Chief Sitting Bull
 Aidan Quinn as Henry L. Dawes
 Colm Feore as General William Tecumseh Sherman
 Fred Dalton Thompson as President Ulysses S. Grant
 Duane Howard as Uncle
 Nathan Lee Chasing His Horse as One Bull
 Brian Stollery as Bishop Whipple
 Shaun Johnston as Colonel Nelson A. Miles
 Gordon Tootoosis as Chief Red Cloud
 Billy Merasty as Chief Young Man Afraid of His Horses
 Morris Birdyellowhead as Chief American Horse 
 Eddie Spears as Chasing Crane
 Sean Wei Mah as Bull Head 
 Eric Schweig as Chief Gall
 Jimmy Herman as Yellow Bird 
 Patrick St. Esprit as Major James Walsh
 J.K. Simmons as James McLaughlin
 Wes Studi as Wovoka / Jack Wilson
 Marty Atonini as Colonel James W. Forsyth
 Lee Tergesen as Daniel F. Royer

Awards and nominations

References

External links
 
 
 
 

2007 television films
2007 films
2007 drama films
2007 Western (genre) films
2000s American films
2000s English-language films
2000s historical drama films
American films based on actual events
American historical drama films
American Indian Wars films
American Western (genre) television films
Cultural depictions of Sitting Bull
Cultural depictions of Ulysses S. Grant
Drama films based on actual events
American drama television films
Films about massacres
Films about Native Americans
Films based on non-fiction books
Films directed by Yves Simoneau
Films scored by George S. Clinton
Films set in South Dakota
Films shot in Calgary
Historical television films
HBO Films films
Primetime Emmy Award for Outstanding Made for Television Movie winners
Revisionist Western (genre) films
Television films based on actual events
Television films based on books
Western (genre) films based on actual events